The Strait Pirates are a Junior B ice hockey team from Port Hawkesbury, Nova Scotia, Canada. The Pirates play at the Port Hawkesbury Civic Centre and are a member of the Nova Scotia Junior Hockey League.

The Pirates are the longest countiously running Junior B franchise in Canada.

History

In 1964 a group headed by Tiger Mackie got together to form a junior hockey club in Port Hawkesbury, Nova Scotia, in an attempt to create a tenant for the new Port Hawkesbury Arena, which began construction in 1963. The team was dubbed the Strait Pirates, and were accepted into the Cape Breton Junior Hockey League (CBJHL) the following year.

For the 1966-67 season the Pirates actively recruited players from across Atlantic Canada and Quebec. The increased strength of the team led to them being kicked out of the CBJHL due to other teams being unable to compete.

In 1992 the Northcumberland Junior B Hockey League folded and the Pirates joined the Mainland Junior B Hockey League, who subsequently changed their name to the Nova Scotia Junior B Hockey League (NSJHL).

In 1998 the Pirates officially shortened their name from the Port Hawkesbury Strait Pirates to just simply the Strait Pirates.

On April 14, 2017 the team announced that ownership would be transferred to the community for the first time in the teams 53-year history. Adam Rodgers was named as the new team president, former head coach Tim MacMillan was named as general manager, and Brad Raike and Brian Tracey were named as assistant general managers.

NHL alumni

 Aaron Johnson
 Mike McPhee

Award winners

Individual awards

Yearly results

References

External links
Pirates website

1964 establishments in Nova Scotia
Ice hockey clubs established in 1964
Ice hockey teams in Nova Scotia
Cape Breton County